Walyunga National Park is a national park in Western Australia, 35 km northeast of Perth along the Great Northern Highway.

The park is situated just behind the Darling Scarp in the Darling Range spread over a steeply sided valley. The Swan-Avon River and the Eastern Railway run through the park and the Avon Descent passes through a set of rapids along this section. The area is dominated by granite outcrops along with smaller dolerite areas, the tops of hills are capped with laterite.

The park has barbeque, parking and toilet facilities. Also it is home to many animals such as grey kangaroo, galah, goanna, magpie, gecko and many other wildlife species. Plants include flooded gum, jarrah, petrophile and hakea. Walyunga is a 6000 year old meeting place used by the Noongar people. Currently it is an official protected area.
The word Walyunga roughly translates to "Happy Place".

See also 
 Protected areas of Western Australia

References

 

National parks of Western Australia
Protected areas established in 1970
Darling Range
Jarrah Forest